Syntypistis cupreonitens is a species of moth of the family Notodontidae first described by Sergius G. Kiriakoff in 1963. It is found in the Chinese provinces of Zhejiang, Jiangxi and Guangdong and in Vietnam.

References

Moths described in 1963
Notodontidae